Tatyana Danshina (born 20 June 1975) is a Russian speed skater. She competed in two events at the 1998 Winter Olympics.

References

1975 births
Living people
Russian female speed skaters
Olympic speed skaters of Russia
Speed skaters at the 1998 Winter Olympics
People from Birobidzhan